Tiandeng is a county in the southwest of Guangxi, China. It is the northernmost county-level division of the prefecture-level city of Chongzuo.

Administrative divisions
There are 4 towns and 9 townships in the county:

Towns:
Tiandeng Town (天等镇), Longming (龙茗镇), Jinjie (进结镇), Xiangdu (向都镇)

Townships:
Dukang Township (都康乡), Ninggan Township (宁干乡), Tuokan Township (驮堪乡), Fuxin Township (福新乡), Dongping Township (东平乡), Jinyuan Township (进远乡), Shangying Township (上映乡), Bahe Township (把荷乡), Xiaoshan Township (小山乡)

Climate

References

External links

Counties of Guangxi
Chongzuo